The 1979 Ball State Cardinals football team was an American football team that represented Ball State University in the Mid-American Conference (MAC) during the 1979 NCAA Division I-A football season. In its second season under head coach Dwight Wallace, the team compiled a 6–5 record (4–4 against MAC opponents) and finished in a tie for fourth place out of ten teams in the conference. The team played its home games at Ball State Stadium in Muncie, Indiana.

The team's statistical leaders included Dave Wilson with 1,452 passing yards, Mark Warlaumont with 713 rushing yards, Stevie Nelson with 487 receiving yards, and Mark Bornholdt with 114 points scored.

Schedule

References

Ball State
Ball State Cardinals football seasons
Ball State Cardinals football